Piecyk is a Polish surname. Notable people with the surname include:

 Danuta Piecyk (born 1950), Polish sprinter
 Willi Piecyk (1948–2008), German politician
 Władysław Piecyk, Polish canoeist

See also
 

Polish-language surnames